Coolie No. 1 is a 1995 Indian Hindi-language comedy masala film, directed by David Dhawan, and written by Rumi Jaffery and Kader Khan. The film stars Govinda, Karisma Kapoor, Kader Khan, Shakti Kapoor, Harish Kumar, Sadashiv Amrapurkar and Mahesh Anand, with music by Anand–Milind. 

This movie was one of the first successful movies of Kapoor. Govinda received the Star Screen Award Special Jury Award for his role in this movie as 'performer of the decade'. Over the years, the movie has become a classic in Hindi film history and is now considered a cult film. The film is a remake of the 1993 Tamil film Chinna Mapillai. In 2020, Dhawan remade the film with the same name with his son Varun Dhawan, Sara Ali Khan and Paresh Rawal.

Plot 
Pandit Shadiram Gharjode (Sadashiv Amrapurkar) brings a prospective groom's family for Malti Choudhry (Karisma Kapoor). But when her father Choudhry Hoshiyar Chand (Kader Khan) learns that that family isn't filthy rich, he insults Gharjode. He vows to teach Hoshiyar Chand a lesson for his arrogance and pride.

On the way home, Shadiram Gharjode bumps into Raju Coolie (Govinda) a bus stand porter who proudly wears his badge - "Coolie No. 1". Raju is known among his fellow porters for being heroic, recently having gotten a drug dealer Mahesh (Mahesh Anand) arrested. When Raju is smitten by Malti's photo, Gharjode hatches a plan to get the poor porter married to Malti and exact his revenge. With Gharjode's guidance and the help of his best friend Deepak Mechanic (Harish Kumar), Raju poses as the prince of Singapore, Kunwar Mahendra Pratap Singh Mehta and wins Malti's heart. In the process, Malti's sister Shalini (Kaanchan) falls for Deepak.

Hoshiyar Chand gets Malti married to Raju, not knowing that he is just a poor porter. When Raju returns home with Malti after the wedding, he pretends that his "father" Gajendra Pratap Singh Mehta (Kulbhushan Kharbanda) has thrown him out of the house for getting married without his consent. Malti tries to make the best out of the given situation by cheering up Mahendra, which makes him feel guilty.

The trouble becomes double when Hoshiyar Chand comes to town to visit his daughter and son-in-law but spots Raju as a coolie at the bus stand. Hoshiyar Chand creates a ruckus, saying that Raju is a fraud who posed as a rich prince and married his daughter. Spontaneously, Raju pretends to not recognize Hoshiyar Chand and shoos him away. Raju comes home dressed as Mahendra and explains that Hoshiyar Chand must have seen his twin brother Raju who his father threw out due to his drinking and gambling addictions. Hoshiyar Chand buys this story and decides to get Shalini married to Raju, so that both his daughters will live filthy rich lives.

Raju keeps getting into trouble since he can be only at one place at one time. One such incident forces Raju, Malti and Hoshiyar Chand to file a missing complaint for Kunwar Mahendra Pratap Singh Mehta. Inspector Rakesh Pandey (Tiku Talsania) gets skeptical of the situation and starts to believe that Raju and his twin brother Mahendra are the same person.

Mahesh Pratap Mehta is disowned by his father Gajendra Pratap Singh Mehta due to his criminal activities. To get back at him and Raju, Mahesh stabs Gajendra and frames Raju for the same. Inspector Pandey arrives to arrest him, but Raju informs him that Gajendra is still alive and needs critical medical care, following which he escapes police custody. Raju runs to Deepak and both of them hatch a plan to pretend to be nurses from Singapore to save Gajendra's life, as that is Raju's only proof of innocence. At the hospital, Inspector Pandey tells Hoshiyar Chand, Malti and Shalini that Raju is just a poor porter who pretended to be Kunwar Mahendra Pratap Singh Mehta.

While trying to save Gajendra, Raju and Deepak bump into Malti, Hoshiyar Chand and Shalini, who comes to abort Shalini's unborn child who came because of Deepak. Raju confesses his fraud to Malti, and she forgives him. Hoshiyar Chand and Malti help Raju and Deepak to stop Mahesh from killing Gajendra. Once he gains consciousness, Gajendra announces that since Raju saved his life, he is like a son to him. Shalini also announces her love for Deepak. When Hoshiyar Chand cries about his sons-in-law being a porter and a mechanic, Shaadiram Gharjode arrives and tells Hoshiyar Chand that it was bound to happen to someone so arrogant and proud of his wealth. Gharjode explains that for a happy marriage, wealth isn't needed - love is.

Cast 
 Govinda as Raju Coolie / Kunwar Mahendra Pratap Singh
 Karisma Kapoor as Malti Choudhry
 Harish Kumar as Deepak Mechanic
 Kaanchan as Shalini Choudhry, Malti's sister
 Kader Khan as Choudhry Hoshiyar Chand Shikaarpuri Barudwallah, Shalini and Malti's father
 Shakti Kapoor as Goverdhan Mama, Shalini and Malti's uncle
 Sadashiv Amrapurkar as Pandit Shaadiram Gharjode / Mahendra's secretary
 Kulbhushan Kharbanda as Gajendra Pratap Singh Mehta, Mahesh's father (cameo appearance)
 Javed Khan Amrohi as a Taxi Driver
 Dinesh Hingoo as a Game Show Host (special appearance)
 Mahesh Anand as Mahesh Pratap Singh Mehta, Gajendra's son (cameo appearance)
 Vikas Anand as Shaadiram's client (special appearance)
 Tiku Talsania as Inspector Rakesh Pandey (guest appearance)
 Shammi as Mrs. Choudhry, Hoshiyar Chand's mother
 Babbanlal Yadav as a street magician (special appearance)
 Mahavir Shah as Shukla, Gajendra's manager (cameo appearance)

Music 
The film's soundtrack album sold around 3.5million units, making it one of the best-selling Bollywood soundtracks of the year.

All songs lyrics are written by Sameer; all music is composed by Anand–Milind.

Track listing

Remake

On 8 March 2019, it was announced that the film will be remade, with David Dhawan as director again and with his son Varun Dhawan and Sara Ali Khan playing the roles of Raju Coolie and Malti Choudhry. The first look poster of the remake Coolie No. 1 was released on 12 August 2019 on Khan's birthday. The film was originally scheduled to release on 1 May 2020 but was shifted to 25 December 2020 because of COVID-19 pandemic. This film started streaming on 25 December on Amazon Prime Video.

References

External links 
 
 Coolie No - 1 on Bollywood Hungama

1990s Hindi-language films
1995 comedy films
1995 films
Cross-dressing in Indian films
Films directed by David Dhawan
Films scored by Anand–Milind
Hindi remakes of Tamil films
Hindi-language comedy films
Indian comedy films